Monkland Avenue may refer to:
 Monkland Avenue (Montreal), a street in Monkland Village
 Monkland Avenue (Ottawa), the southern terminus of Metcalfe Street